Blue Mountain Academy (BMA) is a Seventh-day Adventist Christian boarding high school located in Tilden Township, Pennsylvania. It is located at the foot of the Blue Mountain Range. It is a part of the Seventh-day Adventist education system, the world's second largest Christian school system.

History
Ground breaking for the first building was held on April 14, 1954. The succeeding eighteen months of construction enabled the school to open its doors to the first students in September 1955. The original buildings included the cafeteria, a single wing of the girls' residence, and a double wing of the boys’ residence. Additional land was purchased in 1958, for a total of 725 acres. The administration building was completed in the fall of 1961, the second wing in the summer of 1965 The gymnasium (M.W. Schultz Gymnasium) was completed in the summer of 1967, and the airfield and dairy complex in 1970. Construction commenced on the career education building including auto body, auto mechanics, and graphic arts shops was completed in 1979. In 1983 the Adventist Book Center opened its doors and in 1992 the campus industry became operational.

Blue Mountain Academy is owned and operated by the Pennsylvania Conference of Seventh-day Adventists.

Academics
The required curriculum includes classes in the following subject areas: Religion, English, Oral Communications, Social Studies, Mathematics, Science, Physical Education, Health, Computer Applications, Fine Arts, and Electives. The school, under the leadership of Aaron Webber, has a vocational program, in which freshmen and other new students work in several different locations and areas of campus.

Spiritual aspects
All students take religion classes each year that they are enrolled. These classes cover topics in biblical history and Christian and denominational doctrines. Instructors in other disciplines also begin each class period with prayer or a short devotional thought, many which encourage student input. Weekly, the entire student body gathers together in the auditorium for an hour-long chapel service.
Outside the classrooms there is year-round spiritually oriented programming that relies on student involvement.

See also

 List of Seventh-day Adventist secondary schools
 Seventh-day Adventist education

References

External links
 

Private high schools in Pennsylvania
Educational institutions established in 1955
Adventist secondary schools in the United States
Schools in Berks County, Pennsylvania
1955 establishments in Pennsylvania